Calao may refer to:

Calão language, a former name for the Caló language
Calao River, a river in Luzon, Philippines
Calao Systems, a defunct USB key manufacturer
, the French term for hornbill, as in Hornbill ivory
Citroën Calao, a 1998 Citroën concept car, based on the Berlingo concept car

See also